Susanna is a 1967 Hong Kong Shaw Brothers Studio film directed by Ho Meng Hua, starring Li Ching as the Susanna, or Shan Shan.

Plot 
The film is about Shan Shan and her life.

Cast 
 Li Ching  - Susanna
 Kwan Shan - Lin Cheng Ting
 Alison Chang Yen
 Ho Fan
 Lai Man

Release 
On 16 October 1967, the film was released in Hong Kong.

Awards 
 1967 Best Picture. 14th Asian Film Festival.
 1969 Golden Horse Award - Best Sound Recording.
 1969 Golden Horse Award - Nominated for Best Featured Film.

References

External links

Trailer with English subtitles
 Susanna at senscritique.com

1967 films
Hong Kong romantic drama films
1960s Mandarin-language films
Films directed by Ho Meng Hua